De Eerste Driejarige is a Dutch basketball club from the city of Amsterdam.

History 
DED has a long history going back in the year 1909, when a group of university students started this basketball club in Amsterdam. They gave it the name “De Eerste Driejarige” ("The First Three Years"). The club holds the 2nd place for the number of national championships in the Netherlands. All of them won in the 1940s and 1950s.

Today 
Nowadays, DED participates with four adult men's teams in both national and regional leagues. The team is still based in Amsterdam, playing their games in the Apollohal.

Honours 

Dutch League
 Winners (8): 1946, 1947, 1950, 1952, 1953, 1954, 1956, 1958

References

External links 
 Official website
 NBB Official site

Basketball teams in the Netherlands
Former Dutch Basketball League teams
1909 establishments in the Netherlands
Basketball teams established in 1909
Sports clubs in Amsterdam